Ultimate Defender is a rogue antivirus program published by Nous-Tech Solutions Ltd.  The program is considered malware due to its difficult uninstallation and deceptive operation. It is commonly installed by the Vundo trojan.

Operation 

The program may be obtained via free download. Once installed, it purports to search a user's computer for viruses and other spyware. During installation, however, other files are installed onto the computer. These files are then detected by the software and listed as critical threats requiring immediate removal. Users are prompted to upgrade to a full version of the software, which would be capable of removing the threat - despite the fact that the threat was installed with the software.  

In addition to its purported operation as an antivirus program, the software floods users with multiple false security warnings about threats to the security of files on the computer, overwhelming pop-up blockers such as Norton Antivirus. The software may also alter the operation of screen savers, desktop, and desktop icons, directing users to the software's homepage.

Removal 

The software is related to Ultimate fixer and Ultimate Cleaner, in that the software is extremely difficult to remove once installed. Companies such as Symantec provide detailed instructions for removal of the software, as some commercial anti-spyware programs may be unable to remove the software automatically.

External links

References

Rogue software
Scareware